Guangdong South China Tiger Football Club or simply Guangdong South China Tiger was a professional Chinese football club that last participated in China League One. The team was based in Meixian District, Meizhou, Guangdong and their home stadium was the Meixian Tsang Hin-chi Stadium. Their majority shareholder was engineering, and construction company Shenzhen Techand Ecological Environment Co., Ltd.

History
The club was founded on 3 July 2003 as Dongguan Nancheng F.C. (Simplified Chinese: 东莞南城足球俱乐部) by the Dongguan City Sports Bureau who created them as a Phoenix club to Guangdong Hongyuan F.C. who were sold-off and moved cities in 2001. The club would then gain entry to participate within the 2003–04 Hong Kong First Division League as a foreign team within the league. The Dongguan City Sports Bureau gained sponsorship and investment from real estate developers South City Real Estate Development Company, Guangdong Hongyuan Real Estate Development Company, Guangdong Enterprises Group Co., Ltd., China Everbright, Huang City Development Co., Ltd., Dongguan City Royal Garden residential construction Limited, Carnation New Garden Construction Co., Ltd., The new Bank of Development and Construction Co., Ltd., Dongguan Kuari Footwear Holdings Limited and Dongguan CITIC Group before participating within the league where they finished sixth. The club only spent one season within the Hong Kong league, which was mired by their on-field disciplinary issues against Buler Rangers on March 7, 2004 that saw nine players from Dongguan Nancheng and six from Buler Rangers suspended for their behaviour. After the season ended the club deciding to switch to the Chinese league system in the 2005 league season where they started within the third tier. In the campaign they topped the group stages and reached the semi-final within the play-off's where they lost 3–2 to Nancheng Bayi Hengyuan in extra time, missing out on promotion. After that disappointment the club pulled out of the league and disbanded their first team, however they still maintained their youth system after the season ended.

The club rejoined the China League Two division in 2011 and made significant changes to the club, such as changing their home ground to Dongguan Nancheng Sports Park Stadium, altering their uniforms from red to yellow tops with blue shorts, building a new squad from their existing youth team, changes that saw the club reach the semi-finals of the division play-offs. The club moved to the city of Meizhou and changed their name as Meixian Hakka F.C. on 12 December 2012 making them the first professional football club in Meizhou, which the city like to proclaim as the "Homeland of football" in China due to it being where the Europeans introduced Association football to the country as well as paying homage to the former Chinese footballer and coach Lee Wai Tong who grew up there. This was followed by a move into Meixian Tsang Hin-chi Stadium and a new Head coach in Hirokazu Sakuma. In March 2015 engineering, and construction company Shenzhen Techand Ecological Environment Co., Ltd. took over the club. Once again the club changed its name to Meizhou Meixian Hakka F.C. in January 2016. On 30 December 2016, they changed their name to Meizhou Meixian Techand F.C. so as not to be confused with local rivals Meizhou Hakka F.C. A new badge, a change in home colours to red over the previous yellow tops and blue shorts would complete their transformation of the club. In the 2017 league season under the management of Li Haiqiang the club came runners-up to Heilongjiang Lava Spring F.C. in the division and gained promotion to the second tier for the first time, which saw the players given a bonus of £2.86 million.

The club deleted the owner's information from their name and changed to Guangdong South China Tiger F.C. in answer to Chinese FA's new regulation in January 2019. The club announced its dissolution in February 2020.

Name history
2003–2012 Dongguan Nancheng F.C. 东莞南城
2013–2015 Meixian Hakka F.C. 梅县客家
2016 Meizhou Meixian Hakka F.C. 梅州梅县客家
2017–2018 Meizhou Meixian Techand F.C. 梅州梅县铁汉
2019–2020 Guangdong South China Tiger F.C. 广东华南虎

Coaching staff

Managerial history

  Li Hu (2011)
  Goran Paulic (2012)
  Hirokazu Sakuma (2013)
  Tomoo Tsukoshi (2014)
  Wang Hongwei (2015–2016)
  Li Haiqiang (2017)
  Juan Ignacio Martínez (2018)
  Fu Bo (2018–2020)

Results
All-time league rankings

As of the end of 2019 season.

Dongguan Nancheng didn't compete in 2006–2010.
  At Hong Kong First Division League
  In group stage.

Key
 Pld = Played
 W = Games won
 D = Games drawn
 L = Games lost
 F = Goals for
 A = Goals against
 Pts = Points
 Pos = Final position

 DNQ = Did not qualify
 DNE = Did not enter
 NH = Not Held
 – = Does Not Exist
 R1 = Round 1
 R2 = Round 2
 R3 = Round 3
 R4 = Round 4

 F = Final
 SF = Semi-finals
 QF = Quarter-finals
 R16 = Round of 16
 Group = Group stage
 GS2 = Second Group stage
 QR1 = First Qualifying Round
 QR2 = Second Qualifying Round
 QR3 = Third Qualifying Round

See also
Guangdong Winnerway F.C.

References

External links
Official club website 

 
Defunct football clubs in China
Football clubs in China
2003 establishments in China
Association football clubs established in 2003
Sport in Meizhou
2020 disestablishments in China
Association football clubs disestablished in 2020